A bomb tower is a lightly constructed tower, often 100 to 700 feet (30 to 210 meters) high, built to hold a nuclear weapon for an above ground nuclear test. The tower holds the bomb for the purpose of the investigation of its destructive effects (such as burst height and distance with given explosive yield) and for the adjustment of measuring instruments, such as high-speed cameras. Normally, the bomb tower disintegrates completely on detonation due to the enormous heat of the explosion.

References

Nuclear weapons testing
Towers